Alexandru Buzbuchi (born 31 October 1993) is a Romanian footballer who plays as a goalkeeper for Liga I club Farul Constanța.

Honours

Club
Viitorul Constanța
Liga I: 2016–17
Cupa României: 2018–19
Supercupa României: 2019

References

External links
Profile at official club website

1993 births
Living people
Sportspeople from Constanța
Association football goalkeepers
Romanian footballers
Romania under-21 international footballers
Liga I players
FC Viitorul Constanța players
CS Gaz Metan Mediaș players
FCV Farul Constanța players